Pilia is a genus of jumping spiders that was first described by Eugène Louis Simon in 1902.  it contains only three species, found only in India and Papua New Guinea: P. albicoma, P. escheri, and P. saltabunda.

References

Salticidae genera
Salticidae
Spiders of Asia